Rafael Guas Inclán (1896 – October 12, 1975) was a Cuban politician and Vice President of Cuba.

He was son of Carlos Guas Pagueras, a Cuban independence general and senator and Rosa Inclan. He was  graduate of the University of Havana School of Law where he also later taught classes. Guas was lifelong member of the Liberal Party of Cuba, in 1925 was the youngest elected person to the Cuban House of Representatives, which he presided from April 1927 to August 1933.

Guas went  into exile, with his father and brother Gregorio (a dentist and also member of the Cuban House of Representatives) after President Gerardo Machado was overthrown in August 1933. The three were involved in an automobile accident in Miami on Dec. 6, 1935, as a result of which their father died. The brothers then returned to Cuba to bury their father.

He was a delegate to the Cuban Constitutional Convention 1939-40. He served as senator (1940–44) and governor of the Havana province (1944–48). He was Minister of Communications 1953-54. As president of the Liberal Party, was elected Vice President of Cuba in 1954 as a compromise candidate under Fulgencio Batista. Guas was elected Mayor of Havana in November 1958 but did not assume the post after Castro seized power on January 1, 1959. A street mob burned his law office that day.

Guas sought asylum in the Chilean Embassy in Havana and returned to exile with his wife, Luisa Maria Decall and children, Hilda, Luisa, and Carlos Rafael Guas Decall (an attorney and member of the Cuban House of Representatives). He tried to join the Brigade 2506 prior to the April 1961 Central Intelligence Agency-sponsored Bay of Pigs invasion but was rejected because of his age. His son, Carlos Rafael, died in combat at the Bay of Pigs.

He died in Miami and is buried at Caballero Rivero Woodlawn North Park Cemetery and Mausoleum there.

References

 Latin American Studies website article
 Latin American Studies website article
 New York Times article

20th-century Cuban lawyers
Speakers of the House of Representatives of Cuba
Cuban senators
Government ministers of Cuba
1896 births
1975 deaths
Mayors of places in Cuba
Vice presidents of Cuba
Cuban emigrants to the United States